The Hôtel Continental is a hotel in Ho Chi Minh City, Vietnam. It was named after the Hôtel Continental in Paris, and is located in District 1, the central business district of the city. The hotel is situated on Đồng Khởi Street by the Saigon Opera House and was built in 1880 during the French colonial period. The hotel has undergone refurbishments over the years, while still maintaining the essence of its original architecture and style. The hotel is owned by the state-owned Saigon Tourist.

History
In the old days, Saigon's roads were simply named by ordinal numbers. Starting from the Saigon River bank, Đồng Khởi was the Sixth Road. In 1865, the French Commander Admiral De La Grandiere renamed these roads and Sixth Road became Rue Catinat, a bustling place. Across the street from the future Continental site, the first foundations and floors for factories were built, the first one for Denis Frere. Next was the first drugstore in Saigon, the Solinere Pharmaceutical which opened in 1865.

In 1878, Pierre Cazeau, a home-appliance and construction material manufacturer, started building the Hotel Continental with the purpose of providing the French traveler a French style of luxury accommodation after a long cruise to the new continent. This project took 2 years, and in 1880 the Hotel Continental was inaugurated. 

In the same period, many of Saigon's major colonial buildings were constructed including the Notre Dame Cathedral on Rue Catinat completed in 1880, the Postal and Telecom Service on Rue Catinat completed in 1891, and the Hotel de Ville completed in 1898.

The hotel was refurbished in 1892 by Mr Grosstephan. In 1911, the hotel was sold to Duke Montpensier. In 1930, the hotel had a new owner, Mathieu Franchini, a reputed gangster from Corsica, and later his son Philippe who ran the hotel until the Communist takeover in April 1975.

The Continental had a notable role in the social and political life of Saigon during the French Colonial Era.

During the First Indochina War the Hotel Continental was frequently referred to as Radio Catinat, since this was the rendezvous point where correspondents, journalists, politicians and businessmen talked about politics, the business news, and current events.

Following the partition of Vietnam in 1955, Rue Catinat was renamed Tự Do Street, while Place Garnier was renamed Lam Sơn Square.

During the Vietnam War era the hotel was renamed the Continental Palace and became popular with journalists who nicknamed the ground-floor bar the Continental Shelf. Newsweek and Time magazines each had their Saigon bureaux on the second floor of the hotel.

Following the Fall of Saigon in April 1975 ownership of the hotel was taken over by the Ho Chi Minh City Government and Tự Do Street was renamed Đồng Khởi Street.

The hotel was closed in 1976 and reopened again in 1986 as the Đồng Khởi. The hotel was completely restored from 1988-9 and reopened in 1989 as the Hotel Continental.

Notable Guests
Notable guests include:
Rabindranath Tagore
Andre Malraux
Graham Greene, long-term guest in room 214, who conceived the work The Quiet American about the aftermath of the French Colonial period
Jacques Chirac
Mahathir Mohamed
Hubert Marchat
Tiziano Terzani
Hunter S. Thompson, stayed in room 37 while documenting the last days of Saigon in 1975.

In popular culture
The hotel features prominently in Graham Greene's novel The Quiet American and in its two film adaptations in 1958 and 2002. It also features in Don Winslow's novel Satori.

The Continental also is a central locale in the film Indochine.

See also
 Heritage hotels in Vietnam
 Sofitel Legend Metropole Hanoi
 List of historic buildings in Ho Chi Minh City

References

External links
 Hotel website

Hotels in Ho Chi Minh City
Hotel Continental
Hotels established in 1880
Hotel buildings completed in 1880
1880s establishments in Vietnam